1,000 Hours is the debut EP by American rock band Green Day. It was released on May 26, 1989, through Lookout Records with the catalog number LK 17.

Album information
The 1,000 Hours EP was included on the compilation album 1,039/Smoothed Out Slappy Hours, which includes Green Day's debut LP 39/Smooth, as well as their 1990 EP Slappy.  It has also been back in print on vinyl since 2009, with the reissue of 39/Smooth on vinyl.

Track listing

Personnel
 Billie Joe Armstrong — lead vocals, guitar
 Mike Dirnt — bass, backing vocals
 John Kiffmeyer — drums

Production
 Andy Ernst — recording, mixing
 John Golden — mastering

Artwork
 David Hayes — cover art, graphic design
 Murray Bowles; Susie Grant — photography

References

1989 debut EPs
Green Day EPs
Lookout! Records EPs
Punk rock EPs
Albums produced by Andy Ernst